Martinus "Martien" Houtkooper ( – ) was a Dutch male footballer. He was part of the Netherlands national football team, playing 1 match on 31 August 1919. He was also part of the Dutch national team at the 1912 Summer Olympics, but did not get the bronze medal because he did not play.

See also
 List of Dutch international footballers

References

1891 births
1961 deaths
Dutch footballers
Footballers at the 1912 Summer Olympics
HFC Haarlem players
Netherlands international footballers
Olympic footballers of the Netherlands
People from Zijpe
Association football forwards
Footballers from North Holland